= Rudayh =

Coordinates: 15°53′N 49°00′E

شريوف saharyofza
- Interactive map of شريوف
- Country: Yemen
- Governorate: Hadhramaut
- Time zone: UTC+3 (Yemen Standard Time)

شريوف is a village in eastern Yemen. It is located in the Hadhramaut Governorate.
